Halgerda dalanghita is a species of sea slug, a dorid nudibranch, shell-less marine gastropod mollusks in the family Discodorididae.

Distribution
The holotype of Halgerda dalanghita was collected at Maricaban Island, Luzon, Philippines. Additional specimens from the same locality, Papua New Guinea, and Natal, South Africa were included in the original description. Subsequent records extend the distribution to Japan and the Solomon Islands.

References

Discodorididae
Gastropods described in 1999